Petr Nesterov (born 7 March 2003) is a professional Bulgarian tennis player. Nesterov has a career-high ATP singles ranking of World No. 768 achieved on 30 January 2023, whilst his best doubles ranking is No. 519 achieved on 30 January 2023.

Junior career
As a junior, Nesterov won three singles and four doubles titles and achieved a career-high ranking of World No. 15.  His biggest junior success came in 2021 at the US Open, where he reached the quarterfinals in singles and his first Grand Slam final in doubles with Viacheslav Bielinskyi, but lost 3–6, 7–5, [1–10] to Max Westphal and Coleman Wong in the championship match. Earlier in the year the Bulgarian-Ukrainian duo came close to another doubles final at the French Open, but lost out in the semifinals to eventual champions Arthur Fils and Giovanni Mpetshi Perricard

Professional career

2019-2022: Early Years: Turning Pro, ATP debut
Nesterov made his professional debut at the age of 16, when he received a wildcard for the ITF tournament in Burgas in 2019. Although he lost his first singles match, Petr reached his debut ITF final in doubles with compatriot Simeon Terziev, but the Bulgarian duo couldn't go all the way, losing 3–6, 3–6 to Luca Gelhard and Kai Wehnelt.

A year and a half later, after the end of his junior career, Nesterov started playing regularly on the ITF men's tour. In 2022 he made his debut for Bulgaria Davis Cup team in the World Group II Play-Off tie with Paraguay, but was forced to retire in the third set against Daniel Vallejo.

After reaching two semifinals as a qualifier at the M25 and M15 events in Pirot and Novi Sad, Nesterov made his debut in the top 1000 of the ATP rankings as well as reaching his second doubles final with Simon Anthony Ivanov at the tournament in Novi Sad.

In September, Nesterov made his ATP debut at the 2022 Sofia Open after receiving a wildcard for the qualifying draw of his home tournament. The Bulgarian didn't waste this opportunity and scored his biggest win to date, overcoming World No. 270 Salvatore Caruso in straight sets - 7–6(4), 6–4. Ultimately Petr could not seal his spot into the main draw after a loss to Dragoș Nicolae Mădăraș in the second round. 

Nesterov made his main draw ATP debut with Yanaki Milev at the doubles competition in Sofia, where they reached the quarterfinals defeating Jack Vance and Jamie Vance before losing to eventual champions Rafael Matos and David Vega Hernández.

Year-end ATP ranking

Challenger and ITF World Tennis Tour finals

Doubles: 5 (2–3)

National participation

Davis Cup (2 losses)
Petr Nesterov debuted for the Bulgaria Davis Cup team in 2022. Since then he has 3 nominations with 2 ties played, his singles W/L record is 0–1 and doubles W/L record is 0–1 (0–2 overall).

   indicates the result of the Davis Cup match followed by the score, date, place of event, the zonal classification and its phase, and the court surface.

Junior Grand Slam finals

Doubles: 1 (0–1)

References

External links
 
 
 

2003 births
Living people
Bulgarian male tennis players
21st-century Bulgarian people